Bulatovo is a rural locality (a settlement) in Oksovskoye Rural Settlement of Plesetsky District, Arkhangelsk Oblast, Russia. The population was 314 as of 2010. There are 10 streets.

Geography 
Bulatovo is located 27 km southwest of Plesetsk (the district's administrative centre) by road. Novostroyka is the nearest rural locality.

References 

Rural localities in Plesetsky District